Town privileges or borough rights were important features of European towns during most of the second millennium. The city law customary in Central Europe probably dates back to Italian models, which in turn were oriented towards the traditions of the self-administration of Roman cities.

Judicially, a borough (or burgh) was distinguished from the countryside by means of a charter from the ruling monarch that defined its privileges and laws. Common privileges involved trade (marketplace, the storing of goods, etc.) and the establishment of guilds.  Some of these privileges were permanent and could imply that the town obtained the right to be called a borough, hence the term "borough rights". Some degree of self-government, representation by diet, and tax-relief could also be granted. Multiple tiers existed; for example, in Sweden, the basic royal charter establishing a borough enabled trade, but not foreign trade, which required a higher-tier charter granting staple right.

See also

 City rights in the Low Countries
 City status in the United Kingdom
 Confoederatio cum principibus ecclesiasticis
 German town law
 Imperial free city
 Kulm law
 Lübeck law
 Magdeburg rights
 Market town
 Royal free cities in the Kingdom of Hungary
 Scottish Burgh
 Town privileges in Norway
 Town privileges in Sweden

Privileges
Privileges